Mount Garfield is a  mountain summit located in San Juan County, Colorado, United States. It is situated eight miles south of the community of Silverton, in the Weminuche Wilderness, on land managed by San Juan National Forest. It is part of the San Juan Mountains range which is a subset of the Rocky Mountains of North America. Precipitation runoff from the mountain drains into tributaries of the Animas River. The peak can be seen from U.S. Route 550 and the Durango and Silverton Narrow Gauge Railroad. It is set six miles west of the Continental Divide, one mile west of Electric Peak, and three miles east-southeast of Snowdon Peak.

Climate 
According to the Köppen climate classification system, Mt. Garfield is located in an alpine subarctic climate zone with very long, cold, snowy winters, and cool to warm summers. Due to its altitude, it receives precipitation all year, as snow in winter, and as thunderstorms in summer, with a dry period in late spring.

Geology 
The formation dates to the Statherian period and is interpreted as metamorphosed marine and fluvial sandstone, mudstone, and shale. The formation overlies plutons with an age of 1,707 million years.

Gallery

References

External links 

 Weather forecast: Mount Garfield

Mountains of San Juan County, Colorado
San Juan Mountains (Colorado)
Mountains of Colorado
North American 3000 m summits
San Juan National Forest